is a 1951 novel (禁色 Part 2  was published in 1953) by the Japanese writer Yukio Mishima, translated into English in 1968. The name kinjiki is a euphemism for same-sex love. The kanji 禁 means "forbidden" and 色 in this case means "erotic love", although it can also mean "color". The word "kinjiki" also means colors that were forbidden to be worn by people of various ranks in the Japanese court. It describes a marriage of a Gay man to a young woman. Like Mishima's earlier novel Confessions of a Mask, it is generally considered somewhat autobiographical.

Plot summary
Aging, cynical Shunsuke is one of postwar Japan's most respected authors. While vacationing at an exclusive Japanese resort, he meets Yuichi, a stunningly gorgeous young man of limited means and intellect who is engaged to a prim, conventional young woman from a very well-to-do family. While he needs the marriage for financial reasons, Yuichi innocently confides to the older man that he feels no real physical desire for his bride, or for any woman. The crafty Shunsuke senses an opportunity to mold the malleable, gullible young man into an exquisite weapon of revenge against the female sex as a whole. He tells Yuichi that his inability to feel desire for women is not a weakness but potentially a tremendous source of strength. He advises the young man to go through with the marriage and gain financial security, but also to omit no opportunity to experiment with the emotions of others, and to have as many affairs as possible with both women and men.

Themes

There are many elements Mishima touches on. Two involving the main characters, Yuichi and Shunsuke, are:
 Same-sex love: Yuichi's open and unashamed nature is a driving force of the narrative. Shunsuke's contempt for women leads him to admire Yuichi, who, he feels, is incapable of loving women.
 Misogyny: Shunsuke's contempt for women drives his behavior to use Yuichi as a tool of his revenge.
The most basic thematic element is the clash of opposites:
 Beauty and Ugliness: Yuichi is considered the pinnacle of beauty, while Shunsuke considers himself to be extremely ugly.
 Youth and Aging: The young and old are played against each other. The youthful Yuichi and elderly Shunsuke are at odds, though they are conspirators. The young Kyoko and the mature Mrs. Kaburagi are played against each other for Yuichi's affection.
 Life and Death: Shunsuke is obsessed with death and feels it is more powerful than life.

Reception
Hortense Calisher said the book had a poor reception in the west, but also argued that Mishima "is never limited enough to treat of sex alone."

Adaptations
The first butoh piece was an adaptation of Kinjiki by Tatsumi Hijikata, which premiered in 1959.

The title of the novel was used by David Sylvian and Ryuichi Sakamoto as the name of their theme song for the film soundtrack of Merry Christmas Mr Lawrence, a film set in a Japanese POW camp in Java which includes exploration of homoerotic themes.

Notes

1951 novels
Alfred A. Knopf books
20th-century Japanese novels
Japanese-language novels
Novels by Yukio Mishima
Novels set in Japan
Novels with gay themes
Japanese LGBT novels
1950s LGBT novels
Works originally published in Gunzo (magazine)
Works originally published in Bungakukai